The 1999 Motorola 300 was the sixth round of the 1999 CART FedEx Champ Car World Series season, held on May 29, 1999, on the Gateway International Raceway in Madison, Illinois.

Report

Race 
Juan Pablo Montoya, looking for a record-equalling fourth consecutive series win, led from pole in the early stages of the race from Paul Tracy. After a caution caused due to a crash by Tarso Marques, the leaders came in for stops, and Roberto Moreno led on an alternate pit strategy. Moreno led for a period of time and then pitted, handing Tracy the lead ahead of Michael Andretti, although the second period of stops reversed the order, whereas Montoya lost a lap and dropped out of contention after a fuel miscalculation. Andretti led until another caution came after Tracy and teammate Dario Franchitti collided while battling for second. This led to another round of stops from certain drivers, including Andretti, whereas Hélio Castro-Neves stayed out and took the lead. Castro-Neves led comfortably till lap 189 when the final round of pit stops took place. Castro-Neves, being on older tires and having his last pit stop well back had to put on new tires and more fuel, as did all behind him. Andretti and others who pitted on lap 152, did not have to put on new tires, and also required less fuel, resulting in a much faster stop. This meant that Andretti led after the stops, with Moreno up to second, and P. J. Jones in third. Both Castro-Neves and Franchitti took advantage of the newer tires to pass everyone in front of them and move up to second and third behind Andretti. Andretti, however, was able to hold them off and take his first win in over a year, with Castro-Neves settling for second and Franchitti third.

Classification

Race

Caution flags

Lap Leaders

Point standings after race

References

Motorola 300
Motorola 300
Motorsport in Illinois